Chickasaw State Park is the name of two parks in the United States:

Chickasaw State Park (Alabama)
Chickasaw State Park (Tennessee)